Bhagya Ediriweera (born 14 October 2000) is a Sri Lankan cricketer. He made his List A debut on 28 March 2021, for Sri Lanka Navy Sports Club in the 2020–21 Major Clubs Limited Over Tournament.

References

External links
 

2000 births
Living people
Sri Lankan cricketers
Sri Lanka Navy Sports Club cricketers
Place of birth missing (living people)